Polk City is a city in Polk County, Iowa, United States. The population was 5543 in the 2020 census, an increase from 2,344 in 2000. It is part of the Des Moines–West Des Moines Metropolitan Statistical Area.

Polk City is located along Saylorville Lake and near Big Creek State Park.

History
Polk City was settled in 1846 and incorporated as a city on March 13, 1875. It was an early contender for the seat of Polk County before Des Moines was ultimately chosen. The city took its name from its location in Polk County. Polk City is also known for having the only "town square" in all of Polk County.

Geography

Demographics

2010 census
As of the census of 2010, there were 3,418 people, 1,232 households, and 957 families living in the city. The racial makeup of the city was 97.2% White, 0.8% African American, 0.2% Native American, 0.4% Asian, 0.2% from other races, and 1.1% from two or more races. Hispanic or Latino of any race were 0.9% of the population.

There were 1,232 households, of which 43.8% had children under the age of 18 living with them, 66.3% were married couples living together, 7.3% had a female householder with no husband present, 4.1% had a male householder with no wife present, and 22.3% were non-families. 17.1% of all households were made up of individuals, and 4.5% had someone living alone who was 65 years of age or older. The average household size was 2.73 and the average family size was 3.11.

The median age in the city was 34.4 years. 30.5% of residents were under the age of 18; 5.7% were between the ages of 18 and 24; 30.7% were from 25 to 44; 25.4% were from 45 to 64; and 7.7% were 65 years of age or older. The gender makeup of the city was 50.0% male and 50.0% female.

2000 census
As of the census of 2000, there were 2,344 people, 826 households, and 645 families living in the city. The racial makeup of the city was 98.08% White, 0.30% African American, 0.26% Native American, 0.30% Asian, 0.34% from other races, and 0.73% from two or more races. Hispanic or Latino of any race were 0.68% of the population.

There were 826 households, out of which 43.2% had children under the age of 18 living with them, 70.5% were married couples living together, 5.6% had a female householder with no husband present, and 21.8% were non-families. 15.7% of all households were made up of individuals, and 5.1% had someone living alone who was 65 years of age or older. The average household size was 2.76 and the average family size was 3.15.

28.5% are under the age of 18, 6.4% from 18 to 24, 33.8% from 25 to 44, 22.8% from 45 to 64, and 8.5% who were 65 years of age or older. The median age was 34 years. For every 100 females, there were 99 males. For every 100 females age 18 and over, there were 97.3 males.

The median income for a household in the city was $58,000, and the median income for a family was $64,688. Males had a median income of $41,875 versus $27,863 for females. The per capita income for the city was $23,476, and About 2.0% of families and 2.4% of the population were below the poverty line, including 1.4% of those under age 18 and 15.6% of those aged 65 or over.

Education
North Polk Community School District serves almost all of the city. Polk City is home to North Polk West Elementary, which educates children age 3 through grade 3. Grades 4 and 5 students attend Big Creek Elementary in northeast Polk City, 6-8 graders attend the North Polk Middle school and 9-12 graders attend North Polk High School, both of which are in Alleman, which is roughly 8.5 miles away.

A small section of the city limits extends into the Ankeny Community School District.

References

External links

 
City of Polk City
Polk City Chamber of Commerce

Cities in Polk County, Iowa
Cities in Iowa
Des Moines metropolitan area
Populated places established in 1846
1846 establishments in Iowa Territory